Keemo Mandela Angus Paul (born 21 February 1998) is a Guyanese cricketer who plays for the West Indies cricket team. He made his international debut for the team in 2018. In August 2019, Cricket West Indies named him as the T20 Player of the Year.

Domestic and T20 career
He made his List A debut on 16 January 2015 in the 2014–15 Regional Super50 tournament.

In December 2015, Paul was named in the West Indies squad for the 2016 Under-19 Cricket World Cup. During the tournament, Paul attracted some controversy when he mankaded a batsman in the last over of the final group match between the West Indies and Zimbabwe. The West Indies won the match and consequently finished second in their group, qualifying for the quarter-finals and eventually going on to win the tournament. He took 7 wickets throughout the competition, including 2 in the final against India, as well as averaging more than 40 with the bat for the tournament.

He made his first-class debut for Guyana in the 2016–17 Regional Four Day Competition on 18 March 2017. He made his Twenty20 debut for Guyana Amazon Warriors in the 2017 Caribbean Premier League on 5 August 2017. In October 2017, he scored his maiden century in first-class cricket, batting for Guyana against Jamaica in the 2017–18 Regional Four Day Competition.

In June 2018, he was named the Emerging Cricketer of the Year at the annual Cricket West Indies' Awards. In October 2018, Cricket West Indies (CWI) awarded him a development contract for the 2018–19 season.

In December 2018, he was bought by the Delhi Capitals in the player auction for the 2019 Indian Premier League. In June 2019, he was selected to play for the Montreal Tigers franchise team in the 2019 Global T20 Canada tournament. In July 2020, he was named in the Guyana Amazon Warriors squad for the 2020 Caribbean Premier League.

International career
On 9 March 2018, Paul was added to the West Indies squad for the 2018 Cricket World Cup Qualifier tournament, after Sheldon Cottrell suffered an injury. He made his One Day International (ODI) debut for the West Indies against Afghanistan in the World Cup Qualifier on 15 March 2018.

In March 2018, he was named in the West Indies squad for their Twenty20 International (T20I) series against Pakistan. He made his T20I debut for the West Indies against Pakistan on 1 April 2018.

In July 2018, he was named in the West Indies Test squad for the series against Bangladesh. He made his Test debut for the West Indies on 12 July 2018. In December 2018, in the third and final T20I against Bangladesh, Paul took his first five-wicket haul in T20Is.

In May 2019, Cricket West Indies (CWI) named him as one of ten reserve players in the West Indies' squad for the 2019 Cricket World Cup.

References

External links
 

1998 births
Living people
Place of birth missing (living people)
West Indies under-19 cricketers
West Indies Test cricketers
West Indies One Day International cricketers
West Indies Twenty20 International cricketers
Delhi Capitals cricketers
Guyanese cricketers
Guyana cricketers
Guyana Amazon Warriors cricketers
Quetta Gladiators cricketers
Colombo Stars cricketers
Hobart Hurricanes cricketers
Durban's Super Giants cricketers